U.S. Highway 350 (US 350) is a  northeast-southwest United States highway located entirely within the state of Colorado.

Route description
US 350 starts at a junction with  US 160 northeast of Trinidad, Colorado. The highway runs northeast, past the Perry Stokes Airport and crossing the Purgatoire River.  It then continues the rest of its length along a route chosen by the Atchison, Topeka and Santa Fe Railway, and close to the Mountain Branch of the Santa Fe Trail. The highway passes just northeast of the Piñon Canyon Maneuver Site, then crosses Comanche National Grassland before a junction with  SH 71 going north. At La Junta, the highway turns east on 5th Street, then north on Barnes Avenue before ending at a junction with  US 50.

History
US Highway 350 is commonly thought to continue on into Trinidad sharing highway designation with US Highway 160 from where it officially begins, five miles northeast of Trinidad.  It is US Highway 160 that carries travelers from Trinidad to the 350/160 junction.  At the junction, if proceeding forward (northeast) without any turning movement the highway becomes US 350.  Going southeast at this junction where vehicles have to make a turning movement, US 160 continues onward to Kim, CO and Springfield, CO and beyond.  The creation of the US 160 bypass known as Kit Carson Trail in the mid 1990s, however, on Trinidad's eastern outskirts links US HWY 160 to I-25, and has helped to more properly define US 350's true commencement at the junction five miles northeast of town.

Major intersections

See also

Related U.S. Routes
 U.S. Route 50

References

External links

Endpoints of US highway 350

50-3
50-3
3
Transportation in Las Animas County, Colorado
Transportation in Otero County, Colorado